Yuzhny is a rural locality (a settlement) in Medovskoye Rural Settlement, Bogucharsky District, Voronezh Oblast, Russia. The population was 413 as of 2010. There are 8 streets.

Geography 
Yuzhny is located 36 km southeast of Boguchar (the district's administrative centre) by road. Medovo is the nearest rural locality.

References 

Rural localities in Bogucharsky District